Ayria is a Canadian futurepop/synthpop musical project formed in early 2003 by Toronto's Jennifer Parkin following her departure from the futurepop and EBM band Epsilon Minus.

Biography
The first Ayria album, Debris, was released on Alfa Matrix in 2003.  

During this period, Parkin performed guest vocals for several other projects, including Belgium's Aïboforcen and Implant, and Mexico's Isis Signum, some of which she would return to later on, such as the late 2011 release of two songs with Aïboforcen.

In late 2005, touring for Flicker commenced with several Canadian dates, a UK Festival (Interzone in Cardiff, the first European performance by Ayria), and a U.S. West Coast tour.  2006 saw many more opportunities for Ayria such as a first ever European tour in November as well as a debut performance in Osaka, Japan. As of 2008, Ayria was continuing a full United States tour as the supporting act for The Crüxshadows.  She has played successful shows at DragonCon, alongside figures such as Sir Patrick Stewart, most recently in 2011, and has also performed with the seminal EBM/synthpop band VNV Nation.

The first two songs by Ayria since the release of Flicker included "The Gun Song", featured on the compilation Alfa Matrix - Re:connected [2.0], released in August 2006 and "Six Seconds On All Sides" released on Dancing Ferret's Asleep By Dawn compilation in fall of 2006. The third full-length album, Hearts For Bullets, was released on September 12, 2008, featuring these two songs.

All of her albums have thus far come with double CD versions available that feature a collection of remixed tracks and other inclusions such as side projects and covers.

Ayria's fourth full-length album, Plastic Makes Perfect, released May 24, 2013, during their North American tour with Project Pitchfork.

On April 22, 2016, she released a fifth full-length, titled Paper Dolls. It came in both a single CD, a two disc deluxe version and as a strictly limited pink vinyl. The second CD is a spiritual sequel to the bonus disc Planet Parkin that came with her third album Hearts for Bullets, titled The Heartless Kingdom.

Touring members
Ayria has performed with various band members for her live performances, which have included Mike Wimer, Eric Gottesman, Shaun Frandsen, Joe Byer (v01d), Cam Eleon, Justin Pogue, and Kevin Toole. For her North American tour with Project Pitchfork in 2013 Sarah Wimer joined the live group whereas in 2014 the live formation was completed by Michael Linke, who since then has played the keys beside of Sarah Wimer on various European shows of Ayria.

Discography

Albums
 Debris (Alfa Matrix, November - 2003)
 Flicker (Alfa Matrix, October - 2005)
 Hearts for Bullets (Alfa Matrix, September - 2008)
 Plastic Makes Perfect (Alfa Matrix, May - 2013)
 Paper Dolls (Alfa Matrix, April - 2016)
 This Is My Battle Cry (Artoffact Records, August - 2022)

EPs
 My Revenge on the World (Alfa Matrix, May - 2005)
 The Gun Song  (Alfa Matrix, March - 2008)
 Plastic and Broken EP  (Alfa Matrix, February - 2013)

Compilation albums
 Cyberl@b 4.0 (Alfa Matrix, 2003)
 square matrix 004 (Alfa Matrix, 2004)
 ADVANCED CLUB 0.1
 Re:connected [1.0] (Alfa Matrix, 2004)
 United Vol.I (NoiTekk, 2005)
 Endzeit Bunkertracks: Act I (Alfa Matrix, 2005)
 Cyberl@b 5.0 (Alfa Matrix, 2005)
 Re:connected [2.0] (Alfa Matrix, 2006)
 Fxxk the Mainstream [vol.1] (Alfa Matrix, 2007)
 Endzeit Bunkertracks: Act III (Alfa Matrix, 2007)
 Depeche Mode Tribute Alfa-Matrix Re:Covered (Alfa Matrix, 2009)

Guest appearances
 track Fuck Things Up on Audio Blender by Implant (Alfa Matrix, 2006)
 track Into the Game on Eclectric by Psy'Aviah (Alfa Matrix, 2010)
 track Give It to You by Corporate Soldiers (2010)
 track Letting Go on Balance by Glis (Alfa Matrix, 2003)

References

External links
 
 Ayria official label Alfa Matrix
 
  at VampireFreaks
 Ayria lyrics at Industrial Lyrics
  at MySpace
 Soundsphere Spotlight

Electro-industrial music groups
Canadian industrial music groups
Canadian synthpop groups
Musical groups from Toronto
Musical groups established in 2003
2003 establishments in Ontario
Canadian women in electronic music